Malingara is a village in the commune de Dir in the Adamawa Region of Cameroon.

Population 
In 1967, Malingara contained 93 inhabitants, mostly Gbaya people.

At the time of the 2005 census, there were 235 people in the village.

References

Bibliography 
 Jean Boutrais, Peuples et cultures de l'Adamaoua (Cameroun) : actes du colloque de Ngaoundéré du 14 au 16 janvier 1992, Éd. de l'ORSTOM, Paris, 1993
 Philip Burnham, Opportunity and constraint in a savanna society : the Gbaya people of Meiganga, Cameroon, Academic Press, London, New York, 1980, 324 p. 
 Dictionnaire des villages de l'Adamaoua, ONAREST, Yaoundé, October 1974, 133 p.

External links 
 Dir, on the website Communes et villes unies du Cameroun (CVUC)

Populated places in Adamawa Region